Ozyorny (Yañı Oźongül) is a rural locality (a selo) in Mindyaksky Selsoviet, Uchalinsky District, Bashkortostan, Russia. The population was 404 as of 2010. There are 9 streets.

Geography 
Ozyorny is located 72 km southwest of Uchaly (the district's administrative centre) by road. Uzungulovo is the nearest rural locality.

References 

Rural localities in Uchalinsky District